The 1946 Cincinnati Bearcats football team was an American football team that represented the University of Cincinnati in the Mid-America Conference (MAC) during the 1946 college football season. The Bearcats were led by head coach Ray Nolting and compiled a 9–2 record. The Bearcats won the MAC championship and defeated VPI in the Sun Bowl, 18–6.

Roger Stephens led the Bearcats and ranked sixth nationally with 774 rushing yards and led the nation with an average of 7.66 yards per carry.

Schedule

After the season

The 1947 NFL Draft was held on December 16, 1946. The following Bearcats were selected.

References

Cincinnati
Cincinnati Bearcats football seasons
Sun Bowl champion seasons
Cincinnati Bearcats football